Signal Hill is a historic home and farm complex located at Culpeper, Culpeper County, Virginia. The farmhouse was built about 1900, and is a two-story, asymmetrically cruciform brick house, in a refined, late-Victorian style. It features a one-story, 13-bay, wraparound porch with a hipped roof.  Also on the property are the following contributing elements: three gable-roofed frame barns, two concrete silos, two frame gable-roof sheds, and a small gable-roof
pump house.

It was listed on the National Register of Historic Places in 1999.

References

Houses on the National Register of Historic Places in Virginia
Farms on the National Register of Historic Places in Virginia
Victorian architecture in Virginia
Houses completed in 1900
Houses in Culpeper County, Virginia
National Register of Historic Places in Culpeper County, Virginia